When the Wrong One Loves You Right may refer to:

 When the Wrong One Loves You Right (album), a 1998 album by Wade Hayes
 "When the Wrong One Loves You Right", a 1998 song by Wade Hayes from When the Wrong One Loves You Right
 "When the Wrong One Loves You Right", a 2002 song by Celine Dion from A New Day Has Come